Reunion Tour was the second solo concert tour by American musician Phoebe Bridgers, in support of her second studio album Punisher. The tour began in St. Louis, Missouri on September 3, 2021, and concluded in Tokyo on February 21, 2023.

Background
On April 9, 2020, Bridgers announced the release of her second solo album Punisher, which was released on June 17, 2020. Due to the COVID-19 pandemic, Bridgers was unable to tour the album for any of 2020. The 2021 portion of the tour was originally scheduled to take place in a mix of indoor and outdoor venues, but later moved to exclusively outdoor venues as a continued result of the pandemic. Bridgers announced additional US dates in 2022, as well as European dates. In 2023, Bridgers announced dates in Oceania, Australia, and Asia.

Opening acts
For the 2021 portion of the tour, American electronic pop group Muna and indie rock musician Bartees Strange opened some of the non-festival September dates. The Philadelphia date was opened by musicians Mick Flannery and Susan O'Neill together. The Berkeley date was opened by Julien Baker, billed as a special guest. Charlie Hickey opened night one of the Los Angeles shows, and Matty Healy of The 1975 opened the second show.

The roster of Bridgers' record label Saddest Factory Records, consisting of Muna, Charlie Hickey, Claud and Sloppy Jane, along with Christian Lee Hutson opened the tour for the 2022 North American dates.

Set list
This set list is representative of the show in Chesterfield, Missouri on September 3, 2021. It is not representative of all concerts for the duration of the tour.

"Motion Sickness"
"DVD Menu"
"Garden Song"
"Kyoto"
"Punisher"
"Halloween"
"Chinese Satellite"
"Moon Song"
"Savior Complex"
"ICU"
"Funeral"
"Smoke Signals"
"Scott Street"
"Graceland Too"
"I Know the End"

Encore
"That Funny Feeling" (Bo Burnham cover)

Tour dates

Cancelled shows

Notes

References

Phoebe Bridgers concert tours
2021 concert tours
2022 concert tours
Concert tours postponed due to the COVID-19 pandemic